Robert Allen Mukes (born March 14, 1964) is an American actor living in Los Angeles.

Career
Sometimes credited as Robert "Bonecrusher" Mukes, Mukes played professional basketball in Europe until age 30, then trained for pro-wrestling.  His time in that career field was cut short due to injuries.

The 6' 10" actor is best known for his role as Rufus "R.J." Firefly, Jr. in House of 1000 Corpses, a role he did not reprise in the sequel Devil's Rejects. Mukes is also known for his role as eskimo bounty hunter Abumchuck in the TV series Weeds and his work on HBO's TV series, Westworld.

Mukes attends fan conventions as a celebrity guest, such as San Diego Comic Con, Monster-Mania Con, Scare-a-Con, Scarefest, Days of the Dead, and Rock & Shock.

Filmography

Film

Television

References

External links

1964 births
Living people
20th-century American male actors
21st-century American male actors
American male film actors
American male television actors
American men's basketball players